Putative hydrolase RBBP9 is an enzyme that in humans is encoded by the RBBP9 gene.

Function 

The protein encoded by this gene is a retinoblastoma binding protein that may play a role in the regulation of cell proliferation and differentiation. Two alternatively spliced transcript variants of this gene with identical predicted protein products have been reported, one of which is a nonsense-mediated decay candidate.

Interactions 

RBBP9 has been shown to interact with Retinoblastoma protein.

References

Further reading